The Powerpuff Girls is an American animated television series based on the original 1998 series by Craig McCracken, which is directed by Nick Jennings and Bob Boyle. The series premiered on April 4, 2016. Voice actor Natalie Palamides announced that the series was renewed for a second season that premiered on March 3, 2017 with the series' first 22-minute special, "The Last Donnycorn". The third season premiered on April 8, 2018 and ended on June 16, 2019, marking the end of the series after 3 seasons, 119 episodes, and after airing for 3 years.

During the course of the series, 119 episodes of The Powerpuff Girls aired over three seasons.

Series overview

Episodes

Season 1 (2016)

Season 2 (2017–18)

Season 3 (2018–19)

Shorts

Season 1 
All five digital shorts combined make up the production code of "113".

Season 2

Special (2016)

Notes

References

External links 
 

2010s television-related lists
Lists of American children's animated television series episodes
Lists of Cartoon Network television series episodes
episodes